Mariánský most is a cantilever spar cable-stayed bridge for the road transport, bicycles and pedestrians in the city of Ústí nad Labem, Czech Republic. It was opened in 1998 and is the third bridge in the city. It was designed by the architect Roman Koucký.

Construction
The bridge has a cantilever spar composed of 2 pylons, each of them containing 15 steel cables that hold the bridge deck. The length of bridge deck is 179 m and the height of pylons is 60 m. The weight of the bridge is 3500 tons. The used material is the steel and ferroconcrete.

See also 
 Ústí nad Labem
 cable-stayed bridge
Puente del Alamillo, Seville, Spain

External links

Mariansky Bridge (Ústí nad Labem, 1998)
References / Mariánský bridge in Ústí nad Labem | Vítkovice Steel
Bridgemeister - Mariánský Bridge

Bridges completed in 1998
Bridges over the Elbe
Bridges in the Czech Republic